Dida Diafat (born 24 April 1970) is an Algerian-French Muay Thai kickboxer who became a world champion in Thai kickboxing or Muay Thai at age 21. A fictionalised version of his life is depicted in the 2005 movie Chok-Dee, in which he plays himself.

Biography
At the age of 18, Dida Diafat left the town of Villiers le Bel (Val d'Oise) to join the Muay Thai training camps of Thailand and became 3 years later the first Algerian and Frenchman to be a Muay Thai world champion. He became the first Thai kickboxing fighter to win a contract with a French television channel - specifically, Canal+ in 1994. Following the release of Chok Dee he retired from kickboxing and decided to pursue a career in acting and in the clothing business. He had a role in the 2009 horror film Mutants.

Titles and achievements

Titles
 1991-1998 Competed in 16 World Championships in Muaythai, Kickboxing and won 11 titles
 1993 World Muaythai Champion in Paris
 1992 World Kickboxing Champion in Levallois
 1991 World Muaythai Champion in Paris Bercy
 1991 World Muaythai Champion (-63 kg)
 1989 French Muaythai Champion Class A

Awards
 1997 "Songh Shaï" vase
 1995 Best Foot & Fist Fighter of the Year
 1994 Best Foot & Fist Fighter of the Year
 1993 Best Foot & Fist Fighter of the Year
 2015 Hall of Fame WKL WORLD KICKBOXING LEAGUE

Fight Record

|-  style="background:#fbb;"
| 1996-06-01 || Loss ||align=left| Peter Cunningham ||  || Paris, France || Decision || 12||2:00
|-
! style=background:white colspan=9 |

|-  style="background:#fbb;"
| ? || Loss ||align=left| Tanongsuk Sor.Prantalay || ISKA Lumpinee Stadium || Bangkok, Thailand || Decision || 5 || 3:00

|-  style="background:#fbb;"
| 1995- || Loss ||align=left| Saimai Chor Suananan || World Muaythai Championship || France || Decision || 5 || 3:00
|-
! style=background:white colspan=9 |

|-  style="background:#fbb;"
| 1994-11-12 || Loss ||align=left| Saimai Chor Suananan || World Muaythai Championship || Marseilles, France || Decision || 5 || 3:00
|-
! style=background:white colspan=9 |
|-  style="background:#cfc;"
| 1994- || Win ||align=left| Ramon Dekkers || Muay Thai Gala in Paris || Paris, France || Decision (Unanimous) || 5 || 3:00

|-  style="background:#cfc;"
| 1994-06- || Win ||align=left| David Cummings ||  || Levallois-Perret, France|| KO ||1  ||
|-
! style=background:white colspan=9 |

|-  style="background:#cfc;"
| 1994- || Win ||align=left| Noël Van Den Heuvel || ISKA Kikcboxing || Paris, France|| KO (Punches)|| 5 ||
|-
! style=background:white colspan=9 |

|-  style="background:#cfc;"
| 1993-11- || Win ||align=left| Ramon Dekkers || Muay Thai Gala in Paris || Paris, France || TKO (Doctor stoppage/cut) || 3 ||
|-
! style=background:white colspan=9 |

|-  style="background:#fbb;"
| 1993- || Loss ||align=left| Noël Van Den Heuvel || World Championship || Marbella, Spain|| TKO (Referee Stoppage) || 7 ||
|-
! style=background:white colspan=9 |

|-  style="background:#fbb;"
| 1993-|| Loss||align=left| Chandet Sor Prantalay || Crocodile Farm  || Samut Prakan, Thailand || Decision || 5 || 3:00

|-  style="background:#cfc;"
| 1993-06- || Win ||align=left| Muangphet || Muay Thai Gala in Stade Pierre de Coubertin || Paris, France || Decision || 5 || 3:00
|-
! style=background:white colspan=9 |
|-
|-  style="background:#fbb;"
| 1993-02-14 || Loss ||align=left| Coban Lookchaomaesaitong || Thai Boxing World Championship || Brest, France || Decision (Unanimous) || 5 || 3:00

|-  style="background:#c5d2ea;"
| 1992-11-21 || Draw||align=left| Peter Cunningham ||  || Paris, France || Decision || 12||2:00
|-
! style=background:white colspan=9 |
|-  style="background:#cfc;"
| 1992 || Win ||align=left| Vadim Chemiakin || Gala in Palais des sports || Levallois, France || TKO (Retirement) || 6 ||
|-
! style=background:white colspan=9 |
|-  style="background:#cfc;"
| 1991-12-20 || Win ||align=left| Daris Sor Thanikul || Gala in Palais des sports de Bercy || Paris, France || Decision || 5 || 3:00
|-
! style=background:white colspan=9 |
|-  style="background:#fbb;"
| 1991- || Loss||align=left| Stewart Ballantine|| ||  France || KO (Left hooks) || 5 ||
|-  style="background:#cfc;"
| 1991- || Win ||align=left| Chumpong ||  || France || TKO (Doctor stoppage)||  ||

|-  style="background:#cfc;"
| 1991-06- || Win ||align=left| Sorn Areen || Gala in Palais des sports || Nanterre, France || KO (Punches)|| 4 ||
|-
! style=background:white colspan=9 |
|-  style="background:#fbb;"
| 1991 || Loss ||align=left| Coban Lookchaomaesaitong || World Muaythai Championship || || Decision (Unanimous) || 5 || 3:00
|-
! style=background:white colspan=9 |
|-  bgcolor="#fbb"
| 1990-12-02 || Loss ||align=left| Kongtoranee Payakaroon ||  || England || Decision || 5 || 3:00 
|-
! style=background:white colspan=9 |
|-  style="background:#fbb;"
| 1990 || Loss ||align=left| Fabrice Payen || European Muaythai Championship || || Decision || 5 || 3:00
|-
! style=background:white colspan=9 |
|-  style="background:#fbb;"
| 1990 || Loss ||align=left| Daris Sor Thanikul || Muaythai Gala in Lyon || Lyon, France || || ||
|-  style="background:#cfc;"
| 1989 || Win ||align=left| || French Championship Class A, Final || France || KO || 4 ||
|-
! style=background:white colspan=9 |
|-  style="background:#fbb;"
| 1988 || Loss ||align=left| || || Stains, France || KO || ||
|-
| colspan=9 | Legend:

See also
 List of male kickboxers

References

External links
 
 
 2006 Interview 

People from Bab El Oued
French male kickboxers
French Muay Thai practitioners
Algerian emigrants to France
1970 births
Living people